Dadagavialis is an extinct monospecific genus of gavialid crocodylian that lived during the Early Miocene in what is now Panama.  It was described in 2018, and was proposed to be a member of Gryposuchinae.  However, other studies have shown Gryposuchinae to be paraphyletic and rather an evolutionary grade towards the living gharial, and thus Dadagavialis might just be classified as a member of Gavialidae.

References

Gavialidae
Prehistoric pseudosuchian genera
Fossil taxa described in 2018